Dreaming of Lords is a 1993 Australian documentary about the first cricket tour of an Australian team, fully made up of aboriginals.

References

External links
Speech by Bob Hawke given at the launch of the film
Dreaming of Lords at Creative Spirits
Dreaming of Lords at Screen Australia

1988 films
Australian documentary films
1980s English-language films
1980s Australian films
Documentary films about Aboriginal Australians